The MLW World Middleweight Championship is a professional wrestling championship created and promoted by the American professional wrestling promotion Major League Wrestling (MLW). The title was unveiled on July 18, 2018, it is contested in MLW's middleweight division by wrestlers at a maximum weight of 205 lb (93 kg). The current champion is Lince Dorado who is in his first reign as champion.

History
On June 28, 2018, Major League Wrestling (MLW) announced the creation of the MLW World Middleweight Championship, for their middleweight division instead of the "cruiserweight" division, which is more common in American professional wrestling. It was announced that the title holds a weight limit of 205 lb (93 kg). Also announced was an singles match between Maxwell Jacob Friedman and Joey Ryan to crown the first champion. The title match was later advertised on July 6 during episode 12 of MLW Fusion. The title was unveiled on July 18. The following day, Maxwell Jacob Friedman defeated Joey Ryan to become the inaugural MLW World Middleweight Championship (air date July 27, 2018). The title would be vacated on December 7, after Friedman was sidelined with an elbow injury. Teddy Hart would defeat El Hijo de L.A. Park, Dezmond Xavier, Gringo Loco and Kotto Brazil in a five-way ladder match on December 14 at MLW Fusion Live to win the title.

Reigns

Combined days

References

External links
 MLW Middleweight Title History at Cagematch.net

Middleweight
World professional wrestling championships
Middleweight